Juice is the debut album by Oran "Juice" Jones. It was released in 1986 through Def Jam Recordings and was the first R&B album the label ever released. The album peaked at No. 44 on the Billboard 200 and No. 4 on the Top R&B/Hip-Hop Albums chart, while the album's lead single "The Rain" reached No. 9 on the Billboard Hot 100 and was certified gold on October 7, 1991.

Track listing
"The Rain" – 5:08  (Vincent "V.F." Bell)
"You Can't Hide from Love" – 5:13 (Bell)  
"Here I Go Again" – 4:50  (Al Cleveland, Smokey Robinson, Terry Johnson, Warren Moore)
"Curiosity" – 4:04  (Bell)
"Your Song" – 4:36  (Oran "Juice" Jones, Davy DMX, Larry Smith, Trevor Gale)
"Love Will Find a Way" – 3:55  (Jones, Izzy Flores)
"It's Yours" – 4:07  (Jones, Danny Harris, Kurtis Blow, Steve Breck)
"1.2.1." – 4:14  (Bell, Fredrick Gorden)
"Two Faces" – 4:43 (Michael Gabriel)

Production
Arranged by Vincent "V.F" Bell, Michael Gabriel, James Austin and Fredrick Gorden; Vocals arranged by Oran "Juice" Jones and Vincent "V.F." Bell
Produced by Vincent "V.F." Bell and Russell Simmons; "It's Yours" produced by Kurtis Blow
Recording and Mix Engineers: Andy Wallace, Aquilli Walker, Jay Burnette, Joe Blaney
Mastered by Howie Weinberg

Personnel
Oran "Juice" Jones - vocals
Fredrick Gorden - keyboards, drum programming, backing vocals
Izzy Flores, Michael Gabriel - keyboards
David Miles - guitars
David Boonshoft, Leon Lewis - bass
Joe Damone - drums, percussion
Vincent "V.F." Bell - drum programming, backing vocals
Patience Higgins - saxophone
David "Mr. Motion" Motion - all instruments on "You Can't Hide From Love", "Here We Go Again" and "Your Song"

1986 debut albums
Columbia Records albums
Def Jam Recordings albums
Oran "Juice" Jones albums